Andreas Mikael Carlsson (born 3 April 1973) is a Swedish music producer and pop songwriter.

Biography
Carlsson was part of the Cheiron Studios team until the studio was closed down in 2000. In January 2001, former Cheiron-members Andreas Carlsson, Kristian Lundin and Jake Schulze assumed the lease of the legendary Cheiron studios. Two years later, they launched production-company The Location and publishing-company Location Songs, where writer Savan Kotecha is signed.

Carlsson frequently collaborates with writers Desmond Child and Chris Braide. Together they have written many hit songs, including "Invisible" for Irish boy band D-Side and American Idol contestant Clay Aiken. The song became one of the most performed on American radio in 2004. A more recent collaboration is Katy Perry's "Waking Up in Vegas", featured on her album One of the Boys. Carlsson also co-wrote the song "Strange" for the Alice in Wonderland soundtrack, which was performed by Tokio Hotel and Kerli Kõiv.

In 2008, Carlsson formed production/publishing company Meriola with fellow producer and songwriter Anders Bagge, who has written and produced songs for Madonna, Janet Jackson, Cross Gene and Jennifer Lopez, among others.

In 2009, Carlsson wrote his autobiography Live to Win - låtarna som skrev mitt liv ("The songs which wrote my life"), about his career and journey to where he is today.

Television
Carlsson was part of the jury for the Swedish edition of Idol from 2008, its fifth season. The last season Carlsson was a judge in began its run on 7 September 2010 on the Swedish television channel TV4. On 14 March 2011, Carlsson announced his departure from the jury, citing his desire to go back to songwriting.

In 2012, he was one of the judges on the Swedish version of X Factor. In recent years, Carlsson has been lecturing and giving motivational speeches in different schools in Sweden.

Personal life
He has a son with ex-girlfriend Hannah Graaf, named William, born in 2001.

Notable writing credits

References

External links
 Andreas Carlsson official website
 Interview, HitQuarters Jul 2009

1973 births
Swedish record producers
Swedish songwriters
Musicians from Stockholm
Living people
People from Danderyd Municipality